Pigman is a 2013 Indian Malayalam-language film directed by Avira Rebecca and written by N. Prabhakaran based on his own short story of the same name. The film features Jayasurya and Remya Nambeesan while Jagathy Sreekumar, Harisree Ashokan, Salim Kumar, Suraj Venjaramoodu and K. P. A. C. Lalitha play the rest of supporting cast. It is the second directorial venture of Avira Rebecca whose previous film Thakarachenda was critically well acclaimed. The film tells the story of a young man who dreams of securing high jobs by completing his doctorate, but is forced to spend his days in a pig farm.

Pigman was scripted by N. Prabhakaran, who had earlier written the much acclaimed film Pulijanmam. The story of the film was written by N. Prabhakaran in 1994, which won him the Katha Award for Best Story that year. Vinod Illampilly cranked the camera and the film was produced by T. R. Sreeraj under the banner of Sree Surya Films.

Cast 
 Jayasurya as Sreekumar
 Remya Nambeesan as Sneha
 Harisree Ashokan as Thimmayyan
 M. R. Gopakumar as Madhavan 
 Suraj Venjaramoodu as Dr Daniel 
 Baburaj as GM Veera Swamy 
 Usha as Sreekumar's Elder Sister 
 Nimisha Suresh as Mahalakshmi 
 T. P. Madhavan as Union Head
 Reena Basheer as Dr. Jayalekshmy
 Jaffar Idukki as Davis

Production 
The film had been announced and in pre-production stage for two years, the shoot was further postponed due to other films by lead actor Jayasurya and other members of the cast. The film was launched on 1 November 2011. Various actors and directors in Malayalam cinema including the director Avira Rebecca, Anoop Menon, Lijo Jose Pellissery and M. Jayachandran lit and attended the ceremonial lamp at the function. Shooting commenced on 10 November 2011 and Jayasurya was already set to showcase his skills as a performer in this unusual flick.

Pigman was announced to be predominantly set in various locations of Thodupuzha, Muvattupuzha and Idukki.

References

External links

2010s Malayalam-language films
2013 films
Films based on short fiction
Films about pigs
Films shot in Munnar